Thierry Garnier is a French businessman, chief executive officer (CEO) of Kingfisher, a UK based retail group, since September 2019.

Early life
Garnier earned degrees from École Polytechnique and École des Mines.

Career
Garnier worked for Carrefour for 22 years, rising to CEO of Carrefour Asia from 2012, and was responsible for over 350 stores in China and Taiwan, with 55,000 employees, and gross sales of over €6 billion.

In September 2019, Garnier succeeded Véronique Laury as CEO of Kingfisher plc, a FTSE 100 British multinational retail company.

References

1966 births
Living people
French chief executives
Kingfisher plc
People from Asnières-sur-Seine
Lycée Condorcet alumni
École Polytechnique alumni
Mines Paris - PSL alumni
Corps des mines
Carrefour people